The Campeonato Nacional de Velocidade (CNV, National Speed Championship) is a Portuguese motor racing competition, encompassing GTs, prototype racing cars and touring cars. It was established in the 1960s.

The competition was established in the 1960s and today has Group 5 and Group 4 (racing) cars. In the 1970a and 1980s, Group A and Group B cars took part towards the end of the 1980s and into the 1990s. This was superseded by Group N, that is, production cars with similar specifications to road-legal cars, from the end of the 1990s until 2006.

In 2007, the Campeonato Nacional de Turismos was created for S2000 cars. In 2011, this championship ended because of lack of participants, so the GT cars went to race in the higher class.

Since 2010 the series has been organised by Full Eventos under the "Racing Weekend" brand. As of 2015, the competition consists of five qualifying races and two finals. The CNV is run alongside other competitions such as the Campeonato de Portugal de Clássicos and together they are known under the English-language name "Racing Weekend". These other competitions include:
 Campeonato Nacional de Sport Protótipos
 Campeonato Nacional de GT
 Campeonato Nacional de Turismos

Heats

External links

  (language=pt)

Auto races in Portugal